Poor Schmaltz is a lost 1915 American comedy silent film directed by Hugh Ford and written by Mark Swan. The film stars Sam Bernard, Robert Broderick, Conway Tearle, Dick Bernard, Ruby Hoffman and Leonore Thompson. The film was released on August 23, 1915, by Paramount Pictures.

Plot

Cast 
Sam Bernard as Herman Schmaltz
Robert Broderick as Mr. Hocheimer
Conway Tearle as Jack
Dick Bernard as Count Hugo Victor von Mimmeldorf
Ruby Hoffman as Anne, Queen of the Reds
Leonore Thompson as Louise Hocheimer

References

External links 
 

1915 films
1910s English-language films
Silent American comedy films
1915 comedy films
Paramount Pictures films
Films directed by Hugh Ford
American black-and-white films
American silent feature films
1915 lost films
Lost comedy films
1910s American films